Ōsaka 10th district (大阪府第10区, Ōsaka-fu daijikku or 大阪10区, Ōsaka-jikku) is a single-member electoral district of the House of Representatives, the lower house of the national Diet of Japan. It is located in northeastern Osaka and consists of Takatsuki city and Shimamoto town, the only remaining municipality of Mishima county. As of 2016, 321,805 eligible voters were registered in the district.

A former representative for the district was Kiyomi Tsujimoto, policy chief of the Constitutional Democratic Party. Tsujimoto had originally been elected in 2000 and 2009 for the Social Democratic Party. She left in 2010 after disagreeing with her party's departure from the Democrat-led ruling coalition. Kenta Matsunami is the previous member of the district. In 2012, he ran for the Japan Restoration Party of former Osaka governor and mayor Tōru Hashimoto that won twelve district seats in the prefecture. Tsujimoto failed to gain reelection in 2021.

Before the electoral reform of the 1990s, the area had been part of the five-member Osaka 3rd district.

List of representatives

Election results

References 

Politics of Osaka Prefecture
Districts of the House of Representatives (Japan)